David Graham Pugsley Gwynne (8 December 1904 – 11 December 1934) was a Welsh cricketer.  Gwynne was a right-handed batsman.  He was born in Swansea, Glamorgan.

Gwynne made his first-class debut for Glamorgan in 1922 against Sussex.  He played 2 further first-class matches for the county, against Hampshire in 1922 and Lancashire in 1923. In his 3 first-class matches he scored just 20 runs at a batting average of 3.33 and a high score of 12, while in the field he took a single catch.

Gwynne died at the town of his birth on 11 December 1934.

References

External links
David Gwynne at Cricinfo
David Gwynne at CricketArchive

1904 births
1934 deaths
Cricketers from Swansea
Welsh cricketers
Glamorgan cricketers